Paul Secon (July 13, 1916 – February 24, 2007) was an American entrepreneur and songwriter, who co-founded Pottery Barn with his brother, Morris, in 1950.

Biography
Secon was born to a Jewish family in Philadelphia, the son of immigrants from Russia. He was musically gifted, and played the trumpet, piano, oboe and flute. Secon was the music critic for The Boston Evening Transcript.  In 1950, he was a music editor for Billboard and Variety and a creative songwriter having written for Nat King Cole and The Mills Brothers (among many others) whilst living in New York City when he heard about a business opportunity from Morris. Morris' wife had recently purchased stoneware at a yard sale in their hometown of Rochester, New York. Morris took a liking to the pieces, which were designed by Glidden Parker at his factory in Alfred, New York. Parker informed him that he had three barns full of discontinued or slightly damaged products for sale. The brothers decided to buy the pieces for US$2,500, and, with the help of their father, rented a store on 10th Avenue in New York City to sell their wares, thus giving birth to Pottery Barn.

A year later, an article in The New Yorker praised the store, and customers flocked to it in droves. Secon remained store manager, while Morris, who was also musically inclined, became principal hornist for the Rochester Philharmonic Orchestra and teacher at the Eastman School of Music. In 1959, Secon started taking long trips to Europe in search of new product lines, and asked Morris to help manage the store. In 1966, Secon sold the company to Morris and moved to Denmark, where he pursued his earlier career of music and writing, and where his son, Lucas Secon (best known for his 1994 hit song "Lucas with the Lid Off") was born. In 1980, Secon moved back to the United States and settled in Manhattan before relocating to Rochester in 1997, where he died at his home at the age of 90.

Personal life
Secon was married twice. His first wife was Fairfax Kirby; they had one daughter, journalist Kirby Fairfax (born 1949). His second wife was Danish artist Berta Moltke; they had one son; record producer Lucas Secon, born in 1970.

References

Sources
Hevesi, Dennis (March 7, 2007). "Paul Secon, Entrepreneur Who Helped Found Pottery Barn, Dies at 91". The New York Times. Retrieved on March 8, 2007.
Miller, Stephen (March 6, 2007). "Paul Secon, 91, Founded Pottery Barn". The New York Sun. Retrieved on March 8, 2007.
Diaz, Fernando (March 3, 2007). "Pottery Barn's co-founder dies at 91".  Democrat and Chronicle. Retrieved on March 8, 2007.

American company founders
American businesspeople in retailing
Businesspeople from Rochester, New York
American people of Russian-Jewish descent
Boston Evening Transcript people
1916 births
2007 deaths
Williams-Sonoma people
Journalists from New York (state)
20th-century American businesspeople
20th-century American journalists
American male journalists